Dennis M. Levi is a South African optometrist. He is professor of optometry and vision science and a professor of neuroscience at the School of Optometry of the University of California at Berkeley, in California in the United States. He is a former dean of the same school, an appointment he took up in 2001. He was previously the Cullen Distinguished Professor of Optometry on the faculty of the University of Houston, in Houston, Texas, where he also did his PhD. He is a fellow of the American Academy of Optometry.

Levi has conducted significant research into amblyopia.

References 

Optometrists
University of California, Berkeley School of Optometry faculty
University of Houston alumni
University of Houston faculty
Living people
Year of birth missing (living people)